Barber Asphalt Company of Washington, D.C. started in 1883 was founded by Amzi L. Barber. Barber, born in 1843. Barber first career was a teaching professor, he moved to real estate. In real estate, he found the problem of needing affordable paved roads. He found that asphalt was a great affordable material for paved roads. He added asphalt shingles to his products. In 1879 he moved Headquarters to New York City. He had offices in Washington, D.C. from 1878 to 1912, Philadelphia, Pennsylvania from 1912 to 1938 and Maurer, Perth Amboy, New Jersey from 1938 to 1948. In 1888 Barber leased the largest know asphalt deposit at Pitch Lake Trinidad. Barber opened a subsidiary, called the Iroquois division, and Iroquois Electric Refrigeration Company. Elkins Widener purchased the company in 1898 and merged with his Trinidad Corporation subsidiary. This formed the Asphalt Company of America of New York. In 1899 Asphalt Company of America was sold to John M. Mack and renamed, National Asphalt Company of America.  In 1901 Barber retired from the Barber Asphalt Company. National Asphalt Company of America closed in 1902. In 1903 it opened again as General Asphalt Company. Uintah Railway Company was founded in 1903 by the Barber Asphalt Paving Company. Barber has paved millions of miles of roads. In 1904 Barber returned the company. In the 1920s Barber Asphalt Company opened a refinery in Perth Amboy, New Jersey at the time the town was known as Barber. The Barber Asphalt refinery is now the Perth Amboy Refinery. General Asphalt and Barber division merged in 1936. After the merger, the name was changed to Barber Company, Inc..  In 1938 the name was changed to Barber Asphalt Corporation.  Barber Asphalt entered into a joint venture with Standard Oil Company of California in 1946.
 The joint venture was called California Refining Company.

In 1981 the company closed and sold all its assets. The oil and gas products line (Barber Oil Corporation) was sold to Petro-Lewis Corporation. Shipping sold to Apex Shipping. Coal products (Barber Paramont Coal) to: Hanna Mining Company, W. R. Grace & Company and Liberty Capital Group. American Gilsonite Company stocks to Standard Oil.

World War II
Barber Asphalt Company operated a fleet of oil tankers and coal ships to run Barber Asphalt Company. The ships were used to help the World War II effort. During World War II Barber Asphalt Company operated Merchant navy ships for the United States Shipping Board. During World War II Barber Asphalt Company was active with charter shipping with the Maritime Commission and War Shipping Administration. Barber Asphalt Company operated Liberty ships and tankers for the merchant navy. The ship was run by its Barber Asphalt Company crew and the US Navy supplied United States Navy Armed Guards to man the deck guns and radio.

Ships

Post World War Type Type T2 tanker were sold to Barber Asphalt Company and Trinidad Corporation:
Birch Coulie, T2 tanker 
Chapultepec, T2 Tanker, 26 Dec 1943 was damaged by torpedo, was repaired.
Luckystar, T2 Tanker
Fruitvale Hills, T2 Tanker, used 1947-1965,  was widened and lengthened, renamed San Antonio.
Carleton Ellis, Tanker a Liberty Armadillo-class tanker
Liberty ships operated during World War 2 only:
 Carleton Ellis  
 William E. Pendleton  
Trinidad Corporation ship:
SS Fort Mercer T2 Tanker cracked and then broke in two in a gale in 1952. repaired and rename San Jacinto, explosion‐split T2 tanker in 1964.
Houston, T2 was SS Caribbean
Lyons Creek, T2 Tanker
Clarke's Wharf T2 Tanker 
La Brea Hills T2 Tanker 
New Market T2 Tanker 
Redstone T2 Tanker 
Tillamook T2 Tanker 
Admiralty Bay, built 1971, scrapped 1993 
 Leased ships:
USS Mascoma 1947 to 1948.

See also

World War II United States Merchant Navy
Leitch Manufacturing Co. v. Barber Co.

External links
The Wonderland of Trinidad, by Barber Asphalt Company—a Project Gutenberg eBook
 The T2 Tanker page
 T-tanker list

References 

Defunct shipping companies of the United States
American companies established in 1883